The following list is a discography of production by Daringer, an American hip hop record producer and recording artist from Buffalo, New York. It includes a list of songs produced and co-produced by year, artist, album and title.

2012

Westside Gunn – Hitler Wears Hermes 

 5. "Messhall Talk"

2015

Conway the Machine – The Devil's Reject 

 1. "Coke on the Mirror" (featuring Westside Gunn)
 2. "State Greens"
 11. "Grind"

Westside Gunn – Hitler Wears Hermes II 

 2. "Hall & Nash" (featuring Conway the Machine)
 3. "Eggz"
 4. "Vera Boys" (featuring Keisha Plum)
 6. "Medusa Plate"
 7. "Eric B"
 8. "Never Coming Homme" (featuring High Fashion P and Tiona D)

Westside Gunn – Hitler Wears Hermes III 

 2. "Flyy" (featuring Keisha Plum)
 15. "John Starks" (featuring Conway the Machine)

Conway the Machine – Reject 2 

 All tracks

2016

Westside Gunn – Flygod 

 1. "Dunks" (featuring Conway the Machine)
 2. "Gustavo"
 3. "Shower Shoe Lords (featuring Benny the Butcher)
 6. "Free Chapo" (featuring Conway the Machine)
 7. "Over Gold" (featuring Meyhem Lauren)
 8. "Bodies on Fairfax" (featuring Danny Brown)
 9. "Chine Gun"
 11. "Omar's Coming" (featuring Conway the Machine and Roc Marciano)
 15. "55 & a Half"
 16. "Albright Knox" (featuring Chase)

Griselda – Don't Get Scared Now 

 1. "Chyna"
 2. "Stovetops"
 3. "Visionware"
 4. "Bodies on Bodies (Interlude)"
 6. "Benz Window" (featuring Prodigy)

Westside Gunn – There's God and There's Flygod, Praise Both 

 All tracks

Mach-Hommy – HBO (Haitian Body Odor) 

 14. "Band Anna"
 18. "Bloody Penthouse"

Westside Gunn and Conway the Machine – Hall & Nash 

 7. "Anybody"
 8. "Pat La Fontaine"
 9. "Hall & Nash"

Conway the Machine and Prodigy – Hell Still on Earth 

 1. "Rodney Little"
 2. "Broken Safety"

Benny the Butcher – My First Brick 

 6. ".762"
 9. "3 Missiles" (featuring Conway the Machine and 38 Spesh)

Westside Gunn – Hitler Wears Hermes 4 

 All tracks

2017

Conway the Machine – Reject on Steroids 

 4. "Rick Boxes"
 5. "Spurs" (featuring Benny the Butcher)
 8. "Cooked in Hells Kitchen"
 9. "Priest"
 11. "Through It All"

Action Bronson – Blue Chips 7000 

 11. "The Choreographer"
 12. "Chop Chop Chop"

Westside Gunn – Hitler Wears Hermes V 

 1. "Hebru" (featuring Keisha Plum)
 2. "Mac 15s"
 4. "OG MA"
 5. "Mickey Sunday"
 6. "Down State" (featuring Benny the Butcher)
 8. "RIP Bobby" (featuring Conway the Machine) (produced with The Alchemist)
 9. "Outro"

Westside Gunn and MF Doom – WESTSIDEDOOM 

 1. "Gorilla Monsoon"

Benny the Butcher – Butcher on Steroids 

 2. "Rivi"
 5. "Satriale's" (featuring Conway the Machine and Elcamino)
 9. "Change"

Hus Kingpin – Waves R Us 

 5. "Victims of Vogue" (featuring Westside Gunn)

Conway the Machine – G.O.A.T 

 1. "G.O.A.T"
 3. "Th3rd F" (featuring Raekwon)
 4. "Die on Xmas" (featuring Benny the Butcher)
 5. "Rodney Little" (featuring Prodigy)
 6. "Xxxtras"
 7. "Bishop Shot Steel"
 8. "Mandatory" (featuring Royce da 5'9")
 9. "Arabian Sam's" (featuring Styles P)
 10. "Bullet Klub" (featuring Benny the Butcher and Lloyd Banks)

2018

38 Spesh and Benny the Butcher – Stabbed & Shot 

 5. "2 Weapons"

Conway the Machine – Blakk Tape 

 1. "Night Drive"
 2. "Puzo"
 4. "Alpaca"
 5. "Fish Fry"
 6. "Rare Form"
 9. "Pavement"
 10. "God's Work"

Westside Gunn – Supreme Blientele 

 2. "Gods Don't Bleed" (featuring Jadakiss and Benny the Butcher)
 3. "Dean Malenko"
 5. "Amherst Station"
 6 "RVD" (featuring Keisha Plum)

Kool G Rap and 38 Spesh – Son of G Rap 

 5. "G Heist"

Termanology – Bad Decisions 

 5. "Terminator & The Machine" (featuring Conway the Machine)
 9. "Kaleidoscope" (featuring Smif-n-Wessun)

Conway the Machine – Everybody Is F.O.O.D. 

 1. "Bullet Holez in My Neck"
 2. "Slapbox"
 5. "ODB"
 6. "Land o' Lakes" (featuring Busta Rhymes)
 8. "Fat Freddy"
 10. "212" (featuring Elzhi)
 11. "Sigel in State Prop"

Westside Gunn – Hitler Wears Hermes 6 

 3. "Versace Will Never Be the Same Again"
 10. "Amherst Station 2"

Action Bronson – White Bronco 

 3. "Mt. Etna"
 5. "White Bronco"

Benny the Butcher – Tana Talk 3 

 1. "Intro: Babs" (featuring Keisha Plum)
 2. "Goodnight"
 3. "Scarface vs. Sosa, Pt. 2"
 5. "Fast Eddie"
 7. "Echo Long" (featuring Westside Gunn and Meyhem Lauren)
 8. "'97 Hov"
 9. "Joe Pesci 38"
 10. "Who Are You?"
 11. "Fifty One" (featuring Westside Gunn)
 12. "Rick"
 13. "Langfield"
 14. "All 70" (featuring Conway the Machine)

2019

Your Old Droog – It Wasn't Even Close 

 4. "Bubble Hill"

Flee Lord – Later Is Now 

 1. "Pops Skit"
 10. "Later Is Now Outro"

Benny the Butcher – The Plugs I Met 

 3. "Sunday School" (featuring 38 Spesh and Jadakiss)
 4. "Dirty Harry" (featuring RJ Payne and Conway the Machine)

Westside Gunn – Flygod Is an Awesome God 

 1. "Jul 27th" (featuring Raekwon)
 6. "Thousand Shot Mac" (featuring Conway the Machine, Hologram, and Meyhem Lauren)

RJ Payne – Square Root of a Kilo 

 6. "Purge Night"

Conway the Machine – Look What I Became 

 4. "Tito's Back" (featuring Westside Gunn and Benny the Butcher)

Westside Gunn – Hitler Wears Hermes 7 

 3. "Size 42"

Griselda – WWCD 

 All tracks (produced with Beat Butcha)

2020

Focus The Truth – Immortal 
 5. "Freedom Of Thought" (featuring Ayo The Don)

Westside Gunn – Pray for Paris 

 3. "George Bondo" (featuring Conway the Machine and Benny the Butcher)
 7. "Allah Sent Me" (featuring Conway the Machine and Benny the Butcher)

Eto – The Beauty of It 

 5. "Guilty Interlude"

Flee Lord – Alter Ego Fleeigo Delgado 

 7. "It Ain't Gone Last"

Westside Gunn – Flygod Is an Awesome God 2 

 1. "Praise God Intro" (featuring A.A. Rashid)
 8. "Buffs vs. Wires" (featuring Benny the Butcher and Boldy James)

Conway the Machine – From King to a God 

 1. "From King"
 3. "Lemon" (featuring Method Man) (produced with Beat Butcha)
 4. "Dough & Damani" (produced with The Alchemist)

Action Bronson – Only for Dolphins 

 9. "Shredder"
 11. "Marcus Aurelius"

Westside Gunn – Who Made the Sunshine 
(All tracks produced with Beat Butcha)

 1. "Sunshine Intro" (featuring A.A. Rashid)
 2. "The Butcher and the Blade" (featuring Conway the Machine and Benny the Butcher)
 3. "Ishkabibble's" (featuring Black Thought)
 5. "Big Basha's"
 7. "Ocean Prime" (featuring Slick Rick and Busta Rhymes)
 8. "Lessie" (featuring Keisha Plum)
 10. "Goodnight" (featuring Slick Rick)

2021

Griselda and BSF – Conflicted soundtrack 

 4. "Ain't Hit Nobody" (featuring Flee Lord, Eto, and Westside Gunn)
 8. "3:30 in Houston" (featuring Benny the Butcher) (produced with Beat Butcha)

Tek – Pricele$$ 

 10. "The Machine and TEK" (featuring Conway the Machine)

Benny the Butcher and Harry Fraud – The Plugs I Met 2 

 6. "No Instructions" (produced with Harry Fraud)

Conway the Machine – La Maquina 

 11. "S.E. Gang" (featuring Westside Gunn and Benny the Butcher)

Evidence – Unlearning Vol. 1 

 7. "Moving on Up" (featuring Conway the Machine)

Rick Hyde – Plates II 

 2. "Nova" (featuring Westside Gunn)

Westside Gunn – Hitler Wears Hermes 8: Side B 

 8. "Best Dressed Demons" (featuring Mach-Hommy)
 12. "TV Boy"

2022

Conway the Machine – God Don't Make Mistakes 

 1. "Lock Load" (featuring Beanie Sigel) (produced with Beat Butcha)
 4. "Drumwork" (featuring 7xvethegenius and Jae Skeese)
 7. "John Woo Flick" (featuring Westside Gunn and Benny the Butcher) (produced with Kill)
 8. "Stressed" (featuring Wallo267) (produced with Beat Butcha)
 11. "Babas" (featuring Keisha Plum) (produced with Beat Butcha)

Benny the Butcher – Tana Talk 4 

 2. "Back 2x" (featuring Stove God Cooks) (produced with Beat Butcha)
 5. "10 More Commandments" (featuring Diddy) (produced with Beat Butcha)
 6. "Tyson vs. Ali" (featuring Conway the Machine)
 7. "Uncle Bun" (featuring 38 Spesh)
 10. "Guerrero" (featuring Westside Gunn) (produced with Beat Butcha)

Action Bronson – Cocodrillo Turbo 

 1. "Hound Dog"
 6. "Turkish" (featuring Meyhem Lauren)
 10. "Storm of the Century" (produced with Yung Mehico)

Rick Hyde – Stima 

 3. "Arrivederci"

Westside Gunn, Stove God Cooks, and Estee Nack – Peace "Fly" God 

 10. "Flip V Phil"

al.divino – Guns&Butter 

 12. "Whitechalk"

Meyhem Lauren and Daringer – Black Vladimir 

 All tracks

Rome Streetz – Kiss the Ring 

 5. "Tyson Beckford"

Armani Caesar – The Liz 2 

 5. "Mel Gibson"

References 

Discographies of American artists
Hip hop discographies
Production discographies